In mathematics, particularly in linear algebra, tensor analysis, and differential geometry, the Levi-Civita symbol or Levi-Civita epsilon represents a collection of numbers; defined from the sign of a permutation of the natural numbers , for some positive integer . It is named after the Italian mathematician and physicist Tullio Levi-Civita. Other names include the permutation symbol, antisymmetric symbol, or alternating symbol, which refer to its antisymmetric property and definition in terms of permutations.

Index notation allows one to display permutations in a way compatible with tensor analysis:  where each index  takes values . The key defining property of the symbol is total antisymmetry in the indices. When any two indices are interchanged, equal or not, the symbol is negated: 

If any two indices are equal, the symbol is zero. When all indices are unequal, we have:  where  (called the parity of the permutation) is the number of pairwise interchanges of indices necessary to unscramble  into the order , and the factor  is called the sign or signature of the permutation. The value  must be defined, else the particular values of the symbol for all permutations are indeterminate. Most authors choose , which means the Levi-Civita symbol equals the sign of a permutation when the indices are all unequal. This choice is used throughout this article.

The term "-dimensional Levi-Civita symbol" refers to the fact that the number of indices on the symbol  matches the dimensionality of the vector space in question, which may be Euclidean or non-Euclidean, for example,  or Minkowski space. The values of the Levi-Civita symbol are independent of any metric tensor and coordinate system. Also, the specific term "symbol" emphasizes that it is not a tensor because of how it transforms between coordinate systems; however it can be interpreted as a tensor density.

The Levi-Civita symbol allows the determinant of a square matrix, and the cross product of two vectors in three-dimensional Euclidean space, to be expressed in Einstein index notation.

Definition
The Levi-Civita symbol is most often used in three and four dimensions, and to some extent in two dimensions, so these are given here before defining the general case.

Two dimensions
In two dimensions, the Levi-Civita symbol is defined by:

The values can be arranged into a 2 × 2 antisymmetric matrix:

Use of the two-dimensional symbol is common in condensed matter, and in certain specialized high-energy topics like supersymmetry and twistor theory, where it appears in the context of 2-spinors.

Three dimensions

In three dimensions, the Levi-Civita symbol is defined by:

Analogous to 2-dimensional matrices, the values of the 3-dimensional Levi-Civita symbol can be arranged into a  array:

Some examples:

Four dimensions
In four dimensions, the Levi-Civita symbol is defined by:

These values can be arranged into a  array, although in 4 dimensions and higher this is difficult to draw.

Some examples:

Generalization to n dimensions
More generally, in  dimensions, the Levi-Civita symbol is defined by:

Thus, it is the sign of the permutation in the case of a permutation, and zero otherwise.

Using the capital pi notation  for ordinary multiplication of numbers, an explicit expression for the symbol is:

where the signum function (denoted ) returns the sign of its argument while discarding the absolute value if nonzero.

Properties
A tensor whose components in an orthonormal basis are given by the Levi-Civita symbol (a tensor of covariant rank ) is sometimes called a permutation tensor.

Under the ordinary transformation rules for tensors the Levi-Civita symbol is unchanged under pure rotations, consistent with that it is (by definition) the same in all coordinate systems related by orthogonal transformations. However, the Levi-Civita symbol is a pseudotensor because under an orthogonal transformation of Jacobian determinant −1, for example, a reflection in an odd number of dimensions, it should acquire a minus sign if it were a tensor. As it does not change at all, the Levi-Civita symbol is, by definition, a pseudotensor.

As the Levi-Civita symbol is a pseudotensor, the result of taking a cross product is a pseudovector, not a vector.

Under a general coordinate change, the components of the permutation tensor are multiplied by the Jacobian of the transformation matrix. This implies that in coordinate frames different from the one in which the tensor was defined, its components can differ from those of the Levi-Civita symbol by an overall factor. If the frame is orthonormal, the factor will be ±1 depending on whether the orientation of the frame is the same or not.

In index-free tensor notation, the Levi-Civita symbol is replaced by the concept of the Hodge dual.

Summation symbols can be eliminated by using Einstein notation, where an index repeated between two or more terms indicates summation over that index.  For example,
.
In the following examples, Einstein notation is used.

Two dimensions
In two dimensions, when all  each take the values 1 and 2:

Three dimensions

Index and symbol values
In three dimensions, when all  each take values 1, 2, and 3:

Product
The Levi-Civita symbol is related to the Kronecker delta. In three dimensions, the relationship is given by the following equations (vertical lines denote the determinant):

A special case of this result is

sometimes called the "contracted epsilon identity" 

The previous is then denoted .

n dimensions

Index and symbol values
In  dimensions, when all  take values :

For any , the property

follows from the facts that 
 every permutation is either even or odd, 
 , and 
 the number of permutations of any -element set number is exactly .

Product
In general, for  dimensions, one can write the product of two Levi-Civita symbols as:

Proofs
(Both sides are then one).

Using, we have for 

Here we used the Einstein summation convention with  going from 1 to 2.

To establish, notice that both sides vanish when . Indeed, if , then one can not choose  and  such that both permutation symbols on the left are nonzero. For any such indices, we have

(no summation), and the result follows.

Then follows since  and for any distinct indices  taking values , we have 
(no summation, distinct )

Applications and examples

Determinants
In linear algebra, the determinant of a  square matrix  can be written

Similarly the determinant of an  matrix  can be written as

More generally, we have the identity

Vector cross product

Cross product (two vectors)
Let  a positively oriented orthonormal basis of a vector space.

hence also using the Levi-Civita symbol, and more simply:

In Einstein notation, the summation symbols may be omitted, and the th component of their cross product equals

The first component is

then by cyclic permutations of  the others can be derived immediately, without explicitly calculating them from the above formulae:

Triple scalar product (three vectors)
From the above expression for the cross product, we have:
.

If  is a third vector, then the triple scalar product equals

From this expression, it can be seen that the triple scalar product is antisymmetric when exchanging any pair of arguments. For example,

.

Curl (one vector field)
Then the th component of the curl of  equals

which follows from the cross product expression above, substituting components of the gradient vector operator (nabla).

Tensor density
In any arbitrary curvilinear coordinate system and even in the absence of a metric on the manifold, the Levi-Civita symbol as defined above may be considered to be a tensor density field in two different ways. It may be regarded as a contravariant tensor density of weight +1 or as a covariant tensor density of weight −1. In n dimensions using the generalized Kronecker delta,

Notice that these are numerically identical. In particular, the sign is the same.

Levi-Civita tensors
On a pseudo-Riemannian manifold, one may define a coordinate-invariant covariant tensor field whose coordinate representation agrees with the Levi-Civita symbol wherever the coordinate system is such that the basis of the tangent space is orthonormal with respect to the metric and matches a selected orientation. This tensor should not be confused with the tensor density field mentioned above. The presentation in this section closely follows .

The covariant Levi-Civita tensor (also known as the Riemannian volume form) in any coordinate system that matches the selected orientation is

where  is the representation of the metric in that coordinate system. We can similarly consider a contravariant Levi-Civita tensor by raising the indices with the metric as usual,

but notice that if the metric signature contains an odd number of negatives , then the sign of the components of this tensor differ from the standard Levi-Civita symbol:

More explicitly, when the tensor and basis orientation are chosen such that , we have that .

From this we can infer the identity,

where

is the generalized Kronecker delta.

Example: Minkowski space
In Minkowski space (the four-dimensional spacetime of special relativity), the covariant Levi-Civita tensor is

where the sign depends on the orientation of the basis.  The contravariant Levi-Civita tensor is

The following are examples of the general identity above specialized to Minkowski space (with the negative sign arising from the odd number of negatives in the signature of the metric tensor in either sign convention):

See also
List of permutation topics
Symmetric tensor

Notes

References

External links

 

Linear algebra
Tensors
Permutations
Articles containing proofs